Oliver Cromwell Hartley (1823–1859) was an American lawyer from Galveston, Texas. He served as the reporter for the state's Supreme Court from 1846 to 1859, and published the first codification of state laws in "A Digest of the Laws of Texas" in 1850.

Hartley also served in the Texas state House of Representatives in 1851 and 1852. He died in Galveston on February 13, 1859.
Hartley County, Texas is named for him and his brother Rufus K. Hartley.

External links
 

1823 births
1859 deaths
Members of the Texas House of Representatives
19th-century American politicians